This is a list of Danish princesses from the establishment of hereditary monarchy by Frederick III in 1648. Individuals holding the title of princess would usually also be styled "Her Royal Highness" (HRH) or "Her Highness" (HH).

List of Danish princesses since 1648

References 

Danish princesses
Danish monarchy
Princesses